Drayton Manor High School, formerly Drayton Manor Grammar School, is an academy school located in Hanwell, west London, England. The school was granted academy status in August 2011. Its emblem is a phoenix rising from a crown with the legend 'Nec Aspera Terrent', which means 'hardships do not deter us'.

History
Drayton Manor High School was founded in 1930 as a county grammar school serving local children. With the reorganisation of schools in the London Borough of Ealing and abolition of the tripartite system, Drayton Manor received its first comprehensive intake in 1975 and changed its name to reflect this change in status.

In more recent years, Drayton Manor has distinguished itself as one of the borough's top performing state schools. It was awarded Beacon status in 2000 and won the School Achievement Award for Excellence three years in a row. In the 2012 Ofsted inspection report, the school was rated outstanding.

Students are presently allocated to one of four houses:
  Caladrius - Blue
  Phoenix - Red
  Griffin - Green
  Pegasus - Yellow

Court case
On 28 October 2008, Drayton Manor High School successfully contested a ruling in the High Court. Ealing London Borough Council had accused the school of discriminating against children living in poorer areas by only admitting those that lived close to the school.

Notable alumni
Kamal Ahmed, BBC News Editorial Director (2019-)
Adebayo Bolaji, stage and screen actor, Ghost the Musical, Skyfall.
The Brand New Heavies Music Ensemble
Vernon Coaker, life peer and former Labour MP for Gedling
Peter Crouch, footballer
Hannah J. Davies, Guardian journalist
Holly Earl, actress
The Revd Professor Paul Fiddes, DD, theologian
Sir Michael Fox, Lord Justice of Appeal
Martin Hancock, actor
Ellie Harrison, artist
Shaparak "Shappi" Khorsandi, comedian
Stephen Kinnock, politician
Steve McQueen, artist and film director
Alan Mehdizadeh, West End actor, Billy Elliot the Musical, Kinky Boots
Charles Palmer OBE, President of the International Judo Federation from 1965–79
John Pencavel, economist
Rick Wakeman, rock musician
Nick Goolab, international distance runner

Head teachers
Miss Lisa Mills (current Head Teacher, 1 Jan 2020 - now)
Sir Pritpal Singh (past Head Teacher, 1992 – 31 Dec 2019 )
Christopher Everest (past Head Teacher)

References

Academies in the London Borough of Ealing
Secondary schools in the London Borough of Ealing
Hanwell
 
Educational institutions established in 1930
1930 establishments in England